Kloster Engelberg (Engelberg Abbey) is a Franciscan monastery in Grossheubach in Bavaria, Germany. In the past, a pilgrimage dedicated to a figure of Mary, documented as far back as 1406, was administered by the Capuchins after 1630. Following secularization in the early 19th century, the Capuchins eventually left and the Franciscan order took over the abbey and caring for the pilgrims. The abbey is (partially) open to the public.

Location
Kloster Engelberg is located on the hill Engelberg ("hill of Angels") above the town of Grossheubach, on the right bank of the river Main near the district town of Miltenberg.

It is passed by the long-distance hiking trail Eselsweg which connects Schlüchtern to Grossheubach and follows the route of a historic road that was used to transport salt across the Spessart range.

History

The hill spur on which the abbey is situated was likely used in prehistoric times as a cult site. Around 1300, a wooden chapel dedicated to St. Michael was built there and a statue of Mary erected before 1400. The likely location of this chapel was where the choir of today's church stands. The first documented pilgrimage took place in 1406. In 1469, a brotherhood was established in connection with the Engelberg pilgrimage. In 1483, Grossheubach came to the Archbishop of Mainz in a land swap with the Teutonic Order that had held the village and its surroundings since 1291.

In 1630, Anselm Kasimir von Wambold, Archbishop of Mainz, asked Capuchins from the Rhenish Province to come here. The abbey was finished by 1639. At the same time the church was enlarged and largely achieved its current, Baroque, form. After 1647, the monastery had the status of Konvent (previously it had been a pilgrims' Hospice). In 1697, the Antonius chapel was added. In 1701, the Gnadenbild der Freudenreichen Muttergottes (statue of Mary) from the early or mid-14th century, was set up in a new side-chapel on the right.

When the German ecclesial states were securalized in the early 19th century in what is known as the German mediatization, Engelberg was initially not much affected. The acceptance of novices was forbidden, though, setting it up for eventual extinction. In 1817, the Gymnasium (school) was dissolved. However, in 1828, King Ludwig I of Bavaria ordered the monks to move to Aschaffenburg. The monastery was refounded, but Franciscans of the Bavarian Order Province took over in taking care of pilgrims.

A burial chapel for the Catholic branch of House Löwenstein was built next to the church (the abbey had been their burial site since 1728). In 1899, the church was enlarged towards the west. A terrace was added as well as the room which today serves as a confessional chapel.

The pilgrimage continues. Well into the post-WWII period, some pilgrims climbed the steps to the abbey on their knees while praying.

Description
The pilgrimage way (612 steps of red sandstone, the so-called Engelsstaffeln) through the vineyards from Grossheubach features 14 Baroque chapels and 14 Stations of the Cross from 1866.

The current set of mostly Baroque monastic buildings are quite simple architecturally, reflecting their origins during the Thirty Years' War. Back then, measured by its message, the most important work of art was the larger-than-life statue of St. Michael set above the church portal, created by Zacharias Juncker the Older (from a ) around 1635. It references a much more significant statue of the saint created by Hubert Gerhard for the Michaelskirche at Munich. The statue at Engelberg was erected after the Protestant Swedish had been beaten and driven out of Franconia, turning the monastery into a monument to the resurrected power of the Catholic faith.

The early 14th-century statue of Mary is still on display today in a side chapel of the church. It is around 75 cm tall, carved from wood and painted. The sitting figure holds a scepter in the right hand and the left arm is wrapped around the boy Jesus. Due to its smiling face, it is known as freudenreich (joyful). This is the figure at the centre of the pilgrimage. The oldest, Gothic part of the church, is behind the high altar, only created in 1909. Two other side altars were added around the same time. The one on the right, with a crucifixion scene, originally dates from the early 18th century. The other was stylistically matched to the older altar. This one shows St. Francis putting his arms around Christ on the cross. The ceiling and wall paintings also date to the early 20th century.

Today
It remains one of the most important sites of pilgrimages in the Würzburg diocese.

The church and some other areas of the monastery are open to visitors. The order runs a restaurant and shop in the buildings. The restaurant offers wine grown by the abbey and beer brewed by the Franciscans.

References

External links

 Website (German)

Further reading
 Breuer, Tilmann (et al., ed.): Georg Dehio, Franken, Handbuch der Deutschen Kunstdenkmäler, Bayern I, München/Berlin 1999, p. 406
 Karfreitag, P. Willibald: Geschichte und Beschreibung von Engelberg, Bamberg 1926 
 Mader, Felix/Karlinger, Hans: Bezirksamt Miltenberg, KDB III/XVIII, München 1917, p. 128-135
Madler, Philipp J.: Das Kloster auf dem Engelberg; geschichtlich, topographisch beschriebe, Amorbach, 1843 (Online version)
 Madler, Philipp J.: Das Kloster auf dem Engelberg und die Familiengruft des Fürstenhauses Löwenstein-Wertheim-Rosenberg, Weiden, 1857 (Online version)
 Nutz, Johannes: Großheubach, Engelberg. In: Brückner, Wolfgang/Schneider, Wolfgang (ed.), Wallfahrt im Bistum Würzburg. Gnadenorte, Kult- und Andachtsstätten in Unterfranken, Würzburg 1996, p. 129-132
 Schneider, Erich: Klöster und Stifte in Mainfranken, Würzburg 1993, p. 24
 Spatz, Thomas: Wallfahrtskirche Engelberg ob dem Main, München 1989
 Vad, Nobert: Franziskanerkloster und Wallfahrtskirche Engelberg ob dem Main, Schnell und Steiner, 2006, 

1630 establishments in the Holy Roman Empire
Miltenberg (district)
Franciscan monasteries in Germany
Monasteries in Bavaria